Carmen Gómez (born 17 September 1954) is a Colombian former swimmer. She competed in two events at the 1968 Summer Olympics.

References

External links
 

1954 births
Living people
Colombian female swimmers
Olympic swimmers of Colombia
Swimmers at the 1968 Summer Olympics
Sportspeople from Cali
20th-century Colombian women
21st-century Colombian women